Belgrade Waterfront, known in Serbian as Belgrade on Water, is an urban renewal development project headed by the Government of Serbia aimed at improving Belgrade's cityscape and economy by revitalizing the Sava amphitheater, a neglected stretch of land on the right bank of the Sava river, between the Belgrade Fair and Branko's bridge. It was started in 2014 with the reconstruction of the Belgrade Cooperative building, which was finished in June of the same year. It is the second largest mixed use complex under construction in Europe, just after Minsk Mir, worth 3.5 billion dollars. Belgrade Waterfront complex will include 7,000 residential units for 14,000 residents, luxury hotels including W Hotel and St. Regis, 2000 offices, the largest shopping mall in southeast Europe, and public buildings within a total construction area of 1.8 million sq.

The project was initiated in 2014 between the Government of Serbia and Eagle Hills, a leading Abu Dhabi-based private investment and development company focused on creating new city hubs in high-growth international markets. Around US$ 3,5 billion will be invested by the Serbian government and their UAE partners. The project includes office and luxury apartment buildings, Belgrade Park, Sava Promenada, five-star hotels, and Galerija Belgrade shopping center. The project's central point is Kula Belgrade, a new city landmark.

Location 
Belgrade Waterfront complex is located on the right bank of river Sava, in Sava Amphitheater occupying the central city area from Branko's Bridge to the Belgrade Fair. In the 20th century, with the construction of New Belgrade and the expansion of Belgrade to the south, 100 hectares of this plain area on the right bank of the Sava river became neglected. The elongated plain terrain is bordered by hills, which gives it the appearance of a theater. Hence the name - Sava Amphitheater.

The history of the Sava Amphitheater 
Considerations about the arrangement of this part of Belgrade began almost 100 years ago. For the first time, in 1923, the Russian architect Grigorije Pavlovic Kovaljevski, in the General Plan for the arrangement and expansion of Belgrade, foresaw the space between the Sava river and the railway tracks as a place for new apartment blocks. That was the first time that the name Sava Amphitheater was used to describe the area. Later, at the architectural competition for the Terazije plateau reconstruction in 1929, Nikola Dobrović indicated the direction of Terazije - the Sava Amphitheater route. In the next 80 years, many architects and urban plans foresaw the Sava amphitheater's arrangement and the city's access to the river.

Belgrade Waterfront project

Planning 
The idea of Belgrade Waterfront appeared for the first time on April 12, 2012, as a pre-election promise of Aleksandar Vučić, the candidate representing the Serbian Progressive Party.

On December 12, 2012, Sheikh Muhammad bin Zayed from the United Arab Emirates and Mohamed Alabbar, the founder of Emaar Properties, came to Belgrade with a master plan for the Belgrade Waterfront. That was the first time that the size of the investment venture was stated, which First Deputy Prime Minister Aleksandar Vučić estimated at around 3.1 billion dollars.

In 2014, the Government of the Republic of Serbia determined the Project of Arranging the Coast of Belgrade Belgrade Waterfront as a project of special importance for the Republic of Serbia and the city of Belgrade.

Infrastructure improvements 
Even though the Sava Amphitheater area was relatively unoccupied, significant infrastructural interventions were needed. Some include removing the freight road traffic by building the Pupin Bridge and the road bypass around Belgrade. It was necessary to remove a significant number of tracks and the entire Main Railway Station from the current location to the Prokop location and partially to the New Belgrade station. In addition, the central bus station was also moved. 
 

The project also includes improving the sewerage system and works on water, heating, gas, electric, telecommunications, and irrigation systems in the facilities. During the preparation of the Spatial Plan, it was stated that the amount for infrastructural land development was around 400 million euros, of which about 275 million is the cost of landscaping within the complex, and about 125 million for new facilities, extensions, and connections to other utilities, heating, sewerage, gas and extension lines across the city.

Preparations 
The first construction works on the site began in March 2014 with removing the rails and relocating many ships and wrecks that were stranded or moored to that part of the bank.

The building of the Belgrade Cooperative has been determined to be the seat of the company that will manage the project and perform promotion and sales. Since it has been in a neglected state for decades, the first thing done is reconstruct the building. The reconstruction took place between March and June 2014. 

The master plan and model of the entire area of Belgrade Waterfront was presented on June 27, 2014, and exhibited in the renovated building of the Belgrade Cooperative. Prime Minister Aleksandar Vučić and the Eagle Hills company director Mohamed Alabbar presented the master plan, and it was announced that the investment should amount to 3.1 billion euros. The construction contract was signed on April 26, 2015, between Alabbar, who signed on behalf of the investor, and Deputy Prime Minister and Minister of Construction, Transport and Infrastructure Zorana Mihajlovic and Director of Belgrade Waterfront Aleksandar Trifunovic, who signed it on behalf of Serbia. 

The project envisaged the construction of 177 hectares of land in the center of Belgrade, with more than a million square meters of residential space, 750,000 square meters of business space, 62,000 square meters of public facilities, and 242,000 square meters of green space. The Republic of Serbia owns 32% of the capital, while Eagle Hills owns 68%, and the deadline for construction is set at 30 years. 

The demolition of the old buildings began in August, and the construction of the first two residential buildings – BW Residences - started in September 2015.

Construction 

The building permit for the first facilities was issued on September 24, 2015. The cornerstone was laid on September 27, 2015, by Prime Minister Aleksandar Vučić and Eagle Hills chairman Mohamed Alabbar.

The construction of BW Residences, two residential twenty-story buildings, started in the first phase. With an area of about 68,000 square meters, 72 meters high each, near the Miladin Zarić Bridge, on the bank of the Sava, these buildings have 296 apartments. In 2018, all the apartments were sold out, with almost 300 families moving in the same year.

The cornerstone for the Kula Belgrade, the new symbol of Belgrade, was laid on April 15, 2016, by Prime Minister Aleksandar Vučić, the Mayor of Belgrade Siniša Mali and Eagle Hills chairman Mohamed Alabbar. It was also announced that the Kula Belgrade would be 168 meters high, with 42 floors. The first 11 floors will be reserved for a luxury hotel, and floors above it will have 220 luxury apartments. On the top of the building will be a restaurant and a 360-degree observation deck.

The construction of Galerija Belgrade shopping center, with a gross area of 251,000 m2, began in April 2017, followed by the construction of two residential buildings - BW Vista and BW Parkview - later that year. Tenants of BW Vista and BW Parkview residential buildings moved in during September 2019, and Woodrow Wilson Boulevard and Belgrade Park opened in November of the same year. In 2020, new tenants moved into the BW Magnolia building.

Construction phases 
The construction is planned to take place in four phases.

The first phase includes works in the central coastal part, with four business buildings, including the largest shopping center, Kula Belgrade, a part of the hotel complex, and the first residential building. 

The second phase includes arranging the space near Branko's bridge and between the Gazela bridge and the fairgrounds. This phase also involves constructing several residential buildings and the reconstruction of buildings protected by law.

The third phase introduces the construction of the central part towards Savska Street and residential and business facilities.

In the final, fourth phase, the plan includes constructing apartments and entertainment and cultural facilities.

Construction status 
Finished:

 BW Residences – Two residential towers on the Sava riverbank, with 20 floors each and 296 apartments in total. Construction was started on September 27, 2015, and completed in 2018. 
 BW Parkview – Residential building with 23 floors and 244 units. Construction was started in December 2016 and completed in 2019. 
 BW Vista – Residential building with 23 floors and 228 units. Construction was started in December 2016 and completed in 2019. 
 BW Magnolia —Residential building with five floors and 110 units. Construction was started in 2018 and completed in 2020. 
 Galerija Belgrade — The biggest shopping mall in the region, with 93,000 m². Construction was started on March 26, 2018, and completed in 2020. It was opened on October 30, 2020. 

Under construction:

 BW Aqua – Residential building with 23 floors and 248 apartments. Construction started in 2020, estimated completion date in 2023.
 BW Aria - Residential building with 21 floors and 190 apartments. Construction started in 2020, estimated completion date in 2022.
 BW Arcadia – Residential building with 24 floors and 244 apartments. Construction started in 2018, estimated completion date in 2021.
 BW Aurora – Residential and commercial tower with 23 floors, 244 apartments, and a height of 82 meters. Construction started in 2018, estimated completion date in 2021.
 BW Metropolitan — Residential building with 17 floors and 325 apartments, restaurants, and kindergarten. Construction started in 2019, estimated completion date in 2021.
 BW Terra – Residential building with 19 floors and 153 apartments. Construction started in 2020, estimated completion date in 2023.
 BW Quartet – Residential complex consisting of 4 buildings with a total of 681 apartments. Construction started in 2020, estimated completion date in 2023.
 BW Libera – Residential building with 16 floors and 169 apartments. Construction started in 2021, estimated completion date in 2023.
 BW Sole - Residential building with 16 floors and 184 apartments. Construction started in 2021, estimated completion date in 2024.
 BW Scala - Residential building with 13 floors and 223 apartments. Construction started in 2021, estimated completion date in 2024.
 BW Verde - Residential building with 23 floors and 261 apartments. Construction started in 2019, estimated completion date in 2022.
 BW Terraces – Residential building with 17 floors and 132 apartments. Construction started in 2020, estimated completion date in 2022.
 BW Simfonija – Two residential buildings of identical architectural expression, with 16 floors and 103 apartments. Construction started in 2018.
 Kula Belgrade - Residential and commercial building with 42 floors, 220 luxury apartments, and a 5-star hotel. Construction started on April 15, 2016, estimated completion date in 2022.

Kula Belgrade 
Kula Belgrade, 168 meters high, was envisaged as the Belgrade Waterfront's central point and the capital's future symbol. Its construction sets new standards in the Serbian construction industry and creates a trademark by which Belgrade will be recognizable worldwide. Kula Belgrade will be the country's highest hotel and residential tower featuring an observation deck and set to house luxurious St. Regis Belgrade.

Design 

Kula Belgrade is unique in many aspects, but what distinguishes it from other buildings of that type at first glance is its unusual design that changes the shape of 14 floors, where the building "twists." The rotation of the building represents what makes Belgrade recognizable – the confluence of the Sava River and the Danube. The facade of glass panels will reflect the rivers and the panorama of the city, which gives the appearance of fluidity, and, although it stands out for its size, it fits harmoniously into this part of the city. As the tallest building in Serbia, the Kula Belgrade will have an observation deck at the top with a panoramic view of the entire city.

Interestingly, it will be the first building in Serbia that will not have a 13th floor.

Kula Belgrade was designed by internationally recognized design firm Skidmore, Owings & Merrill. Their famous works include the 345 California Center building in San Francisco, the Hancock building, and Willis Tower in Chicago. Probably their most famous building is the Burj Khalifa in Dubai, the tallest building in the world.

Hotel 
The St. Regis Belgrade hotel will occupy the first 11 floors of the Kula Belgrade and offer more than 100 rooms and suites looking out to the city or the Sava river. The hotel will feature a destination restaurant at the top of the tower with panoramic views, an all-day dining restaurant, a St. Regis Bar, spa, pool, and event and meeting space for special celebrations.

Branded apartments 
Kula Belgrade will offer the first branded St. Regis apartments in Europe. So-called The Residences at The St. Regis Belgrade will offer a privileged lifestyle experience. Starting on the 14th floor of Kula Belgrade, the residences are well-appointed for contemporary life.

Kula Plaza 
Next to the Kula Belgrade, a new city square will take place. Kula Plaza will be a new public space at the nexus of several important connections and the continuation of the new and popular bike and pedestrian routes along the Sava River. The Plaza will host concerts, festivals, markets, events, recreation, performances, and seasonal events such as a holiday market and ice skating. The Plaza space will also extend the adjacent Kula Belgrade ballroom and provide a new venue for outdoor social events at that edge. The Kula Belgrade and Kula Plaza together take about 5-6000 square meters of space. Kula Plaza was designed by SWA Group.

Galerija Belgrade 
 
Galerijа Belgrade, the biggest shopping, dining, and entertainment destination in the region, was opened on October 30, 2020, in the presence of Eagle Hills Chairman Mohamed Alabbar, the President of Serbia Aleksandar Vucic, and Prime Minister Ana Brnabić.

With a total area of 300,000 sqm, the biggest green roof in the region, and 3,600 parking spaces, all international standards of the industry were applied. In addition to the biggest trampoline park in this part of Europe, there is also Cineplexx Galerija Belgrade – a multiplex cinema with nine halls and more than 1,700 seats, which presents the world’s best IMAX® technology for movie projection to the Serbian market.

Tax-free shopping 
Galerija Belgrade is the only place in Serbia where foreign visitors can get a VAT refund immediately after purchase at three points within the mall. This service is provided through cooperation with Global Blue, the world leader in Tax-Free shopping.

Revenue and profit 
The revenue of the Belgrade Waterfront company in 2021 will amount to more than 140 million euros, and the estimated profit is expected to be over 25 million euros. The basic income of the company comes from the sale of real estate, which has been making significant progress over the years, with 3,000 apartments being sold since the beginning of the construction.

In 2018 and 2019, total revenue was over 170 million euros.

Financial statements of the company Belgrade Waterfront d.o.o. clearly show positive growth of over 11 million euros since the start of the project. The value of business assets is more than 700 million euros.

Criticism 
In July 2014, a group of 50 international scholars and experts on urban development and planning from the International Network for Urban Research and Action (INURA) penned an open letter to the people of Belgrade, stating their concerns regarding the Belgrade Waterfront project and the potential economic and environmental impacts on the city.

Among Belgrade residents, there is a great deal of contempt for the project. The points criticised encompass the lacking of a public consultation process as well as the disconnect of the lifestyle of Belgrade's middle and upper classes on one hand and the target group of the developed apartments on the other hand. In addition to this, the intransparency and perceived backroom nature of the Belgrade Waterfront deal has caused real anger, expressed most visibly by the street protests organised by the movement Do not let Belgrade d(r)own, accusing the development of money laundering and corruption.

In May 2016, thousands of people took to the street to protest against an incident where dozens of men with masks demolished buildings in the area, where the Belgrade Waterfront complex is planned to be built. Contrasting the allegations of the protesters, the government denies any responsibility in and knowledge of the event.

Awards 

 2018: The Belgrade Waterfront project won the European Property Award in the „Best Mixed-use Development“ category. 
 2019: The Belgrade Waterfront project won the European Property Awards in the „Best Mixed-use Development“ category for the second year in a row.
 2020: The Belgrade Waterfront project won the European Property Award in the “Developer Website” category, awarded for the best European real estate and retail projects.
 2021: Galerija Belgrade won the EuropaProperty CEE Retail & Marketplace Award in the category of the best large shopping mall in Central and Eastern Europe.

See also
Architectural projects under construction in Belgrade
Belgrade Metro
Serbia–United Arab Emirates relations
Kula Belgrade

References

External links

 
Savski Venac